In re Ross, or Ross v. McIntyre, 140 U.S. 453 (1891), was a US Supreme Court case decided on May 21, 1891, that dealt with the application of American law by US consular courts over foreign sailors on American-flagged ships in countries in which the United States exercised extraterritorial jurisdiction.

Background
John M. Ross, a Canadian sailor on the American ship Bullion, was convicted in the US consular court in Yokohama of murder on the ship while it was in that city before the US consul general at Kanagawa, Thomas van Buren. Ross was sentenced to death, but US President Rutherford B. Hayes commuted the sentence to a life sentence of hard labor at Albany 
Penitentiary.

Although Ross accepted the commutation, he later sought a writ of habeas corpus for his release on the grounds that having been born on Prince Edward Island, he was a British subject and so was not subject to the jurisdiction of a US consular court.

Decision
The Supreme Court upheld the jurisdiction of the court on the basis that having enrolled on a US ship, Ross became subject to the jurisdiction of US courts.

See also
List of United States Supreme Court cases, volume 140

External links
 
 

United States Supreme Court cases
United States Supreme Court cases of the Fuller Court
United States admiralty case law
1891 in United States case law
History of Yokohama
Canada–United States relations